Popovka is a rural locality (a village) in Novlenskoye Rural Settlement, Vologodsky District, Vologda Oblast, Russia. The population was 69 as of 2002.

Geography 
The distance to Vologda is 67 km, to Maysky is 7 km. Pogostets is the nearest rural locality.

References 

Rural localities in Vologodsky District